National School for Folklore Arts "Filip Kutev" is a Bulgarian school for folklore located in Kotel, Bulgaria.

History 
National School for Folklore Arts "Filip Kutev", named after famous Bulgarian composer Filip Kutev, was founded on 2 October 1967. Until 2004 the school was called Major Musical School "Filip Kutev". In the school there were vocal groups and choirs. The first classes were focused on Traditional Bulgarian Folklore and folklore from the other Bulgarian regions. The first director of the school is Vladimir Vladimirov.

Graduates 
Teodosii Spasov - Bulgarian musician
Dancho Radunov - Bulgarian musician
Dimitar Lavchev - Bulgarian musician
Binka Dobreva - Bulgarian singer
Tanya Miteva Nedeva - Singer with Ensemble Filip Kutev

References 

Schools in Bulgaria
Folklore studies
Educational institutions established in 1967